Hansje is a Dutch feminine given name. It is a short form and diminutive of Johanna and Hans. 

People with the name include:
Hansje Bunschoten (1958–2017), Dutch freestyle swimmer
Hansje van Halem (born 1978), Dutch graphic designer and type designer

See also

References

Dutch feminine given names